The 4711th Air Defense Wing is a discontinued United States Air Force organization. Its last assignment was with the 30th Air Division of Air Defense Command (ADC) at Selfridge Air Force Base, Michigan, where it was discontinued in 1956.  It was established in 1952 at Presque Isle Air Force Base, Maine as the 4711th Defense Wing in a general reorganization of Air Defense Command (ADC), which replaced wings responsible for a base with wings responsible for a geographical area.

It assumed control of several fighter Interceptor squadrons that had been assigned to the 23d Fighter-Interceptor Wing, including two Air National Guard squadrons mobilized for the Korean War.   In early 1953 it also was assigned six radar squadrons in Maine, Vermont, and New York and its dispersed fighter squadrons combined with colocated air base squadrons into air defense groups.  The wing was redesignated as an air defense wing in 1954.  In 1956, as ADC prepared to implement the Semi-Automatic Ground Environment (SAGE) air defense system, the wing lost its combat components and moved to Selfridge, where it was discontinued.

History
The wing was organized as the 4711th Defense Wing at the beginning of February 1952 at Presque Isle AFB, Maine as part of a major reorganization of ADC responding to ADC's difficulty under the existing wing base organizational structure in deploying fighter squadrons to best advantage. The wing assumed operational control and the air defense mission of fighter squadrons formerly assigned to the inactivating 23d Fighter-Interceptor Wing (FIW). The 74th Fighter-Interceptor Squadron (FIS) and 74th FIS, flying North American F-86 Sabre aircraft were at Presque Isle, while the 101st FIW's 132d FIS, flying Lockheed F-80 Shooting Stars was at Dow AFB, Maine, and the 134th FIS, flying World War II era North American F-51 Mustangs was at Burlington Municipal Airport, Vermont. The two dispersed squadrons were federalized Air National Guard (ANG) squadrons that had been attached to the 23rd FIW. The 27th FIS at Griffiss AFB, another F-86 squadron, was transferred to the wing from direct assignment to Eastern Air Defense Force. The support elements of the 23rd FIW's 23rd Air Base Group and 23rd Maintenance & Supply Group were replaced at Presque Isle by an air base squadron and air base squadrons were activated at Presque Isle and Burlington to support the fighter squadrons at those bases. The wing's mission was to train and maintain tactical units in a state of readiness to intercept and destroy enemy aircraft attempting to penetrate the air defense system in the Northeastern United States.

In June, the 74th FIS converted to Northrop F-89 Scorpion interceptor aircraft, but by fall its F-89Cs had been grounded and the squadron was forced to convert to F-94 Starfires. In November 1952, the two ANG fighter squadrons were returned to the control of their states and replaced by the 37th FIS at Ethan Allen and the 49th FIS at Dow.

In February 1953, another major reorganization of ADC activated Air Defense Groups at ADC bases with dispersed fighter squadrons. Two groups were assigned to the wing and assumed direct control of the fighter squadrons, as well as support squadrons to carry out their role as the USAF host organizations at their bases. As a result of this reorganization, the 528th Air Defense Group activated at Presque Isle and assumed control of the fighter squadrons there, while the 517th Air Defense Group activated to command the squadron at Ethan Allen AFB. The reorganization also resulted in the wing adding the radar detection, control and warning mission, and it was assigned six Aircraft Control & Warning Squadrons (AC&W Sq) to perform this mission. The 49th FIS traded in its F-80s for F-86s in the same month. Meanwhile, the 75th FIS moved to Suffolk County AFB in October and was reassigned to another wing.

In 1954, two of the wing's squadrons upgraded to radar equipped and rocket armed fighters. The 49th FIS received later model F-86D Sabres, while the 27th FIS converted to F-94C Starfires.

In 1955, ADC implemented Project Arrow, which was designed to bring back on the active list the fighter units that had compiled memorable records in the two world wars. As a result of Project Arrow, the 23d Fighter Group (Air Defense), replaced the 528th Air Defense Group at Presque Isle, while the 14th Fighter Group replaced the 517th Air Defense Group at Ethan Allen. In October, a second F-89 squadron, the 465th FIS, activated at Griffiss AFB

In preparation for the implementation of the Semi-Automatic Ground Environment (SAGE) air defense system, the 4711th wing lost its operational units in March 1956 and moved to Selfridge AFB where it was discontinued shortly thereafter.

Lineage
 Designated as the 4711th Defense Wing and organized on 1 February 1952
 Redesignated as the 4711th Air Defense Wing on 1 September 1954
 Discontinued on 8 July 1956

Assignments
 Eastern Air Defense Force, 1 February 1952
 32nd Air Division, 16 February 1953
 30th Air Division, 1 March 1956 – 18 October 1956

Components

Groups

Fighter Groups
 14th Fighter Group (Air Defense), 18 August 1955 – 1 March 1956
 Ethan Allen AFB, Vermont, 16 February 1953 – 18 August 1955
 23d Fighter Group (Air Defense), 18 August 1955 – 1 March 1956

Air Defense Groups
 517th Air Defense Group
 Ethan Allen AFB, Vermont, 16 February 1953 – 18 August 1955
 528th Air Defense Group, 16 February 1953 – 18 August 1955

Squadrons

Fighter Squadrons
 27th Fighter-Interceptor Squadron
 Griffiss AFB, New York, 6 February 1952 – 1 March 1956
 37th Fighter-Interceptor Squadron
 Ethan Allen AFB, Vermont, 1 November 1952 – 16 February 1953
 49th Fighter-Interceptor Squadron
 Dow AFB, Maine, 1 November 1952 – 5 November 1955
 74th Fighter-Interceptor Squadron, 6 February 1952 – 16 February 1953
 75th Fighter-Interceptor Squadron, 6 February 1952 – 16 October 1952
 132d Fighter-Interceptor Squadron
 Dow AFB, Maine, 6 February 1952 – 1 November 1952
 134th Fighter-Interceptor Squadron
 Burlington Municipal Airport (renamed Ethan Allen AFB), Vermont, 6 February 1952 – 1 November 1952
 465th Fighter-Interceptor Squadron
 Griffiss AFB, New York, 8 October 1955 – 1 March 1956

Support Squadrons
 75th Air Base Squadron
 Ethan Allen AFB, Vermont, 1 February 1952 – 16 February 1953
 85th Air Base Squadron, 1 February 1952 – 16 February 1953

Radar Squadrons
 127th Aircraft Control & Warning Squadron
 Fort Williams, Maine, 16 February 1953 – 1 September 1953
 128th Aircraft Control & Warning Squadron
 Dow AFB, Maine, 16 February 1953 – 1 September 1953
 655th Aircraft Control & Warning Squadron
 Watertown AFS, New York, 16 February 1953 – 1 March 1956
 677th Aircraft Control & Warning Squadron
 Fort Williams AFS, Maine, 1 September 1953 – May 1954
 679th Aircraft Control & Warning Squadron
 Dow AFB, Maine, 1 September 1953 – December 1953
 764th Aircraft Control & Warning Squadron
 Bellevue Hill (later Saint Albans AFS), Vermont, 16 February 1953 – 1 March 1956
 765th Aircraft Control & Warning Squadron
 Charleston AFS, Maine, 16 February 1953 – 1 March 1956
 766th Aircraft Control & Warning Squadron
 Caswell AFS, Maine, 16 February 1953 – 1 March 1956
 792d Aircraft Control & Warning Squadron
 Ethan Allen AFB, Vermont, 1 November 1953 – December 1953
 907th Aircraft Control & Warning Squadron
 Syracuse AFS, New York, November 1954 – February 1955, Bucks Harbor AFS, Maine – 1 March 1956
 911th Aircraft Control & Warning Squadron
 Syracuse AFS, New York, June 1955 – 1 March 1956

Stations
 Presque Isle AFB, Maine, 1 February 1952
 Selfridge AFB, Michigan, 1 March 1956 – 8 July 1956

Aircraft

 F-51D, 1952–1953
 F-80C, 1952
 F-86A, 1952
 F-86D, 1953–1956
 F-86F, 1953–1954

 F-89C, 1952, 1953–1954
 F-89D, 1954–1956
 F-94B, 1952–1953
 F-94C, 1954–1956

Commanders
 Col. Charles H. McDonald, 1 February 1952 – after Mar 1952
 Col. Norvel K. Heath, by Jul 1952 – 1952
 Col. James O. Beckwith, 1952 – unknown

See also
 List of MAJCOM wings of the United States Air Force
 List of United States Air Force Aerospace Defense Command Interceptor Squadrons
 List of United States Air Force aircraft control and warning squadrons

References

Notes

Bibliography

 Buss, Lydus H.(ed), Sturm, Thomas A., Volan, Denys, and McMullen, Richard F., History of Continental Air Defense Command and Air Defense Command July to December 1955, Directorate of Historical Services, Air Defense Command, Ent AFB, CO, (1956)
 
  Grant, C.L., (1961)  The Development of Continental Air Defense to 1 September 1954, USAF Historical Study No. 126

Further reading
 
 
 
 

Four Digit Wings of the United States Air Force
Air defense wings of the United States Air Force
Military units and formations established in 1952
Military units and formations disestablished in 1956
Military units and formations in Maine